Rzhavets is a rural locality (a selo) and the administrative center of Rzhavetskoye Rural Settlement, Prokhorovsky District, Belgorod Oblast, Russia. The population was 481 as of 2010. There are 6 streets.

Geography 
Rzhavets is located 29 km south of Prokhorovka (the district's administrative centre) by road. Krasnoye Znamya is the nearest rural locality.

References 

Rural localities in Prokhorovsky District